"Torna a casa" is a rock ballad song by Italian group Måneskin. It was released on 28 September, 2018 by Sony Music and was included in their debut album Il ballo della vita.

The single topped the FIMI chart in Italy and received the quintuple platinum certification. By 31 January 2022, the music video on YouTube has gathered more than 145 million views.

Music video
The music video for "Torna a casa", directed by Giacomo Triglia and shot inside Villa Arconati, premiered on 1 October 2018 via Måneskin's official YouTube channel.

Charts

Certifications

References

2018 songs
2018 singles
Italian-language songs
Måneskin songs
Sony Music singles
Songs written by Damiano David
Songs written by Victoria De Angelis
Number-one singles in Italy